Rutgers University-Busch Campus is a census-designated place (CDP) covering the residential population of the Busch Campus of Rutgers University in Middlesex County, New Jersey. 

It first appeared as a CDP in the 2020 Census with a population of 4,586.

Demographics

2020 census

Note: the US Census treats Hispanic/Latino as an ethnic category. This table excludes Latinos from the racial categories and assigns them to a separate category. Hispanics/Latinos can be of any race.

References

Census-designated places in Middlesex County, New Jersey
Rutgers University
Census-designated places in New Jersey